Atif Ali Khan (11 February 1986) is a Pakistani-born cricketer who played for the United Arab Emirates national cricket team. He made his List A debut for the United Arab Emirates cricket team in their three-match series against Oman in October 2016. He made his Twenty20 International (T20I) debut against Afghanistan on 16 December 2016.

References

External links
 

1986 births
Living people
Emirati cricketers
United Arab Emirates Twenty20 International cricketers
Cricketers from Sialkot
Pakistani emigrants to the United Arab Emirates
Pakistani expatriate sportspeople in the United Arab Emirates